Five Ways may refer to:

Places 
Five Ways, Birmingham, a city area in England
Five Ways railway station, in Birmingham
Five Ways, Paddington, a junction in Sydney, Australia
Five Ways, Victoria, a locality in Devon Meadows, Australia

Other uses 
Five Ways (Aquinas) or Quinque viæ, arguments for God's existence
King Edward VI Five Ways School, a state grammar school in Birmingham, England

See also
Fiveways (disambiguation)
Tipton Five Ways railway station